Maksim Borisovich Pichugin (born 30 October 1974) is a Russian cross-country skier. He competed in the men's 30 kilometre classical event at the 1998 Winter Olympics.

Cross-country skiing results
All results are sourced from the International Ski Federation (FIS).

Olympic Games

World Championships

World Cup

Season standings

Team podiums
 1 victory – (1 ) 
 1 podium – (1 )

References

External links
 

1974 births
Living people
Russian male cross-country skiers
Olympic cross-country skiers of Russia
Cross-country skiers at the 1998 Winter Olympics
People from Novokuznetsk
Sportspeople from Kemerovo Oblast